Prince Alfred College (also referred to as PAC, Princes, or in sporting circles, The Reds) is a private, independent, day and boarding school for boys, located on Dequetteville Terrace, Kent Town – near the centre of Adelaide, South Australia. Prince Alfred College was established in 1869 by the Methodist Church of Australasia, which amalgamated with other Protestant churches in 1977 to form the Uniting Church in Australia.

The school has enrolment of some 1,160 students from Reception to Year 12 (ages 2 to 18), including some 151 boarders from years seven to twelve. Prince Alfred College launched its own Early Learning Centre, Little Princes, in 1999, which was renamed Princes ELC in 2009, with a current enrolment of 260 students.

History 
Prince Alfred College was named after Prince Alfred during his visit to Adelaide in 1867. Alfred was one of the four sons of Queen Victoria and her husband Prince Albert. The school has attracted many royal visitors since its foundation, including Queen Elizabeth II and Prince Philip in 1954.

The founders of PAC were determined that the religious traditions of John Wesley, the founder of Methodism, should be indoctrinated in the school. Young Methodist men of the colony and PAC were encouraged to live disciplined, hard working and predominantly Christian lives, even though they were mocked facing society's temptations.

The only female student to attend the school was Lilian Staple Mead, daughter of Baptist minister Silas Mead, in 1883-1884, in order to matriculate and enter University at a time when few schools were available for girls to do so.

At one time, Princes was the only college in Adelaide to offer the IB Diploma at all three stages; the PYP and MYP are compulsory units of work for Preparatory and Middle school students, enabling its students to continue to complete the Diploma in year 11 and 12, or to be recognised nationally with the SACE.

On Wednesday 18 April 2018, Elizabeth II's son, Prince Edward, Earl of Wessex, visited Prince Alfred College, and participated in an unveiling a stone to commemorate the sesquicentennial of the College. In 2019, Prince Alfred College celebrated its sesquicentenary 150th Anniversary.

List of headmasters
 1869–1870 Samuel Fiddian 
 1871–1875 John Hartley
 1876–1914 Frederic Chapple 
 1915–1929 W. R. Bayly 
 1930–1948 Fred Ward 
 1949–1969 John Dunning 
 1970–1987 Geoffrey Bean 
 1988–1999 Brian Webber 
 2000–2004 Dr. Stephen Codrington 
 2004–2014 Kevin Tutt 
 2014–2022 Bradley Fenner
 2022–Current David Roberts

Campuses
The original school campus is in the Adelaide suburb of Kent Town. The school also owns two other campuses, one for outdoor education in Scott's Creek, and the other in Point Turton named 'Wambana', developed specifically for boys to spend extended periods of time away from home to experience all of the responsibilities adults have to face like; cooking, cleaning, time management and food shopping.

Kent Town
The original and main campus is located in Kent Town, approximately 2 km east of the Adelaide city centre. The land, originally leased by Dr Benjamin Archer Kent from 1840 to 1859, then bought by Charles Robin, was bought at auction from Charles Robin for £2750 on 18 September 1865. However, it was not until 22 June 1969 that the college celebrated its inauguration, two years after the laying of the foundation stone by H.R.H. Prince Alfred, Duke of Edinburgh.

A feature of the college is the Main Building, which was built in three sections.  The central section was ready for use in 1869 and housed offices, teaching areas, a residence for the Headmaster, and accommodation for boarders, who have been an important aspect of the College's history. The Waterhouse Wing (south) was added in 1877, and increased the boarding accommodation, as well as providing an assembly room, and a science laboratory. The Cotton Wing (north), added in 1881, further expanded boarding space and teaching areas. The science hall was opened in 1891, and the Main Building was completed in 1889. The cast-iron fence and railings around the front of the grounds were erected by 1905 by the NCP. The former residence of Alexander Dowie became the preparatory school in 1911.

The school campus is divided by the main building, with the preparatory school on the Flinders Street (south) side of the school, and the middle and Senior schools on the Capper Street (north) side. Some of the facilities within the Kent Town Campus include:
 Accommodation for approximately 140 boarding students
 Classrooms
 Computer Rooms
 Science Laboratories 
 Frederic Chapple Library
 The Preparatory Library
 The Gerard Theatre
 The Eric Freak Memorial Chapel
 ANZAC Hall
 Piper Pavilion
 The John Dunning Sports Centre
 RED Centre (Sports and Health Centre)

Eric Freak Memorial Chapel
Eric Freak Memorial Chapel was built in 1972 as a memorial to Eric Freak (1916–34, PAC 1929–33), an outstanding tennis player who succeeded in schoolboy championships and promised a brilliant career in the game before his premature death. The Chapel contains a number of instruments including a grand piano and an organ.

ANZAC Hall
ANZAC Hall was relaunched in September 2010 after renovation works which turned it into a fully equipped theatre facility with audio and lighting capabilities. The building provides extensive facilities for music, drama, workshops, seminars and associated events.  ANZAC Hall seats up to 800 people. The hall is currently being redone and is due to open for the start of term 2.

Piper Pavilion
The Piper Pavilion, adjacent to ANZAC Hall, is a venue for exhibitions, trade shows, seminars, conferences, cocktail receptions and flow on events from ANZAC Hall.

The John Dunning Sports Centre
The John Dunning Sports Centre is a facility for the preparatory school's students.  It seats approximately 700 people, and can also be used for hosting theatrical performances, art shows, luncheons, alumni events and presentation evenings.

Sports Centre (RED Centre)
The Sports Centre is a flexible multi-purpose sporting and health facility, including a two court basketball stadium, an indoor swimming pool, change room facilities, squash courts, and a number of multi-purpose teaching and function spaces. It was redeveloped, and was completed in early 2013. It also houses a health and fitness studio.

Scotts Creek Campus 
Scotts Creek campus is the college's Murray River retreat.  The Scotts Creek Outdoor Centre is located near Morgan, approximately 165 km from Adelaide. It provides a mix of environmental education, adventure and personal development activities.

Wambana Campus
Wambana Campus is an off school ground recreational camp. The primary purpose of Wambana is to foster growth by helping adolescent boys better manage the transition to adulthood through immersion in community, academic, spiritual and outdoor adventures.

Wambana is a six-acre (approx. 2.5 hectares) property situated on the coast of southern Yorke Peninsula, bordering the township of Point Turton and rural farming land. Students and staff live in a small village in which residential accommodation and a classroom are clustered around a central meeting facility. The property consists of six accommodation buildings known as "Wardlis" (aboriginal word meaning "dwelling"). Wambana accommodates up to 32 students for five-week periods.

Houses
Since its inception, the college has used a "House" system – all students belong to a House. It is the school's aim that activities that are part of the House system continue to build the strong community feel that the founding fathers envisaged in 1869.

Over the course of each year, students participate in inter-house competitions for the Wesley Cup – competitions include swimming, athletics, rowing, chess, debating, music and drama performances, and year level lunchtime sports.  The "Academic Effort" grades earned by students also contribute to the House points tally.

Currently, the PAC Houses are Taylor (Green), Cotton (Blue), Watsford (Orange) and Waterhouse (Yellow).  At the time of the school's centenary (1969), the houses were Bayly (Red), Cotton (Blue), Waterhouse (Yellow) and "School"; at that time all boarders were members of School House.

The houses play in competitions to see who wins the house cup (Wesley cup) and the spirit cup.

Sport
Prince Alfred College is a member of the Sports Association for Adelaide Schools (SAAS).

Rowing

Rowing began at PAC in 1883 and has played an important part in the school's sporting culture since that time. The school has two boat houses, at West Lakes and by the Torrens Lake in the City of Adelaide's parklands. The school employs a full-time Director of Rowing, (currently Mr. Will Maling). Although competition in local and national regattas forms an integral part of the rowing programme, the main event for each year is the Head of the River. The school won the Head of the River in 2012, 2013 and 2014, captained by Jack Kelly (2012), Nicholas Parletta (2013) & William Burfield (2014). These years marked the first time the college has won three consecutive titles at the event.

Intercol
Each sports team at Princes has an annual fixture against traditional longtime rivals Saint Peter's College, known as the "Intercol" (Inter-collegiate). These are considered by the two colleges to be the most important games of the seasons, and the fiercely fought matches of the more popular sports draw big crowds of students and old scholars from both schools. The Intercols have been played for over 100 years. At one time, the Australian rules football and the Cricket intercols were both played on Adelaide Oval. The Cricket Intercollegiate match has been competed since 1878. According to Richard Sproull this is "the oldest unbroken annual contest in the history of cricket" (Weekend Australian 5/6 December 1992).

Outdoor education
The Prince Alfred College Outdoor Education programme provides a variety of integrated activities designed to allow boys to face challenges beyond those possible in a suburban day school. Current activities are focused on the Scotts Creek Outdoor Centre at Morgan on the River Murray.

In 2008, the college opened its Wambana Campus at Point Turton on the Yorke Peninsula. Year 9 students spend 5 weeks at the new facility, learning field science and mathematics along with other subjects and life skills as well as community service.

Year 11 students undertake practical leadership training and are encouraged to nominate for trips to Nepal, New Zealand, Papua New Guinea and Kangaroo Island.

Notable alumni 
See People educated at Prince Alfred College

Notable old scholars of Princes include:

Rhodes Scholars
The Rhodes Scholarship is a postgraduate scholarship for study at Oxford University. South Australian recipients who attended PAC include:

Politics, public service and the law
Cory Bernardi (1969–), Senator for South Australia from 2006 to 2020
Harold Boas (1883–1980), Perth architect and town planner
Sir John Lavington Bonython (1875–1960), editor of The Advertiser, Lord Mayor of Adelaide (1927–1930)
Grant Chapman (1949–), Member for Division of Kingston (1975–1983) and Senator for South Australia (1988–2008)
David Combe (1943–), National Secretary of the Australian Labor Party from 1973 to 1981.
 John Lancelot Cowan, Member for the District of Southern Districts (1949–1959) in the South Australian Legislative Council
Charles Glover (1870–1936), first Lord Mayor of the City of Adelaide (1919)
Lionel Logue, CVO (1880–1953), speech therapist who successfully treated King George VI's stammer
 Major-General Sir Newton Moore KCMG (1870–1936), eighth Premier of Western Australia, World War I general, member of the UK House of Commons
Sir Geoffrey Reed (1892–1970), judge in the Supreme Court of South Australia, first Director-General of ASIO
Nick Xenophon (1959–), South Australian Legislative Council member (1997–2008) and Senator for South Australia (2008–2017), leader of the SA-Best party.
Lyell McEwin (1897–1987), politician

Academia and education
Herbert Basedow (1881–1933), Anthropologist, geologist, explorer, politician
Russel Ward (1914–1995), historian
David Horner (1948–), historian
C. J. Coventry (1991–), historian
William Bayly, Headmaster – Geelong College Vic and Prince Alfred College SA
Sir Brian Hone OBE FACE (1907–1978), Headmaster – Cranbrook School NSW and Melbourne Grammar School Vic

Medicine and science
Herbert Basedow (1881–1933), Anthropologist, geologist, explorer, politician
Roger Brissenden (1962–) Deputy Director, Harvard-Smithsonian Center for Astrophysics
Henry Brose (1890–1965), Physicist, translator, pathologist, biochemist, academic, Rhodes Scholar
Sir Raphael Cilento, medical practitioner and public health administrator
Sir John Burton Cleland, CBE (1878–1971), Naturalist, microbiologist, mycologist, ornithologist, Professor of Pathology
Henry Fry, DSO (1886–1959), Physician, anthropologist, Rhodes Scholar
Bill Griggs, AM, ASM, doctor
Brian Kenneth Hobbs (1937–2004), doctor
Howard Rayner (1896–1975), doctor
Con Stough – Professor of Psychology – Swinburne University
John Burnard West (1928– ), respiratory physiologist

Business
  Tim Cooper (1955–), CEO of Coopers Brewery
  Glenn Cooper (1952–), Executive Chairman of Coopers Brewery 
Robert Gerard, businessman, previously Chairman of Gerard Industries
Sir Edward Holden (1885–1947), Founder of Holden, vehicle manufacturer
Greg Siegele, Co-founder of Ratbag Games Pty Ltd

Military and defence
 Major-General Sir Newton Moore KCMG (1870–1936), eighth Premier of Western Australia, World War I general, member of the UK House of Commons
 John Alexander Raws, journalist and WW1 diarist, killed in action 23 August 1916 at Pozieres – no known grave
 Lieutenant Leonard Taplin, DFC, World War fighter ace, pioneer aerial photographer and aerial cartographer
 Captain Hugo Vivian Hope Throssell, VC (1884–1933), soldier, farmer

Entertainment, media and the arts
Sir John Ashton, OBE, ROI (1881–1963), Painter and Director of the National Art Gallery of New South Wales
Charles Baeyertz (1866–1943), publisher of The Triad, critic and broadcaster
 Chris Bailey (1950–2013), bass guitarist with ARIA award-winning Australian Bands 'The Angels' and 'GANGgajang'
David Basheer, Association Football commentator and analyst on SBS
John Henry Chinner (1865–1933), caricaturist and PAC board member 
Bob Francis (1939–2016), radio presenter, FIVEaa
Robert Hannaford, AM (1944–), portrait painter and sculptor
Ivor Hele (1912–1993), war artist and prolific portraitist
Sir Robert Helpmann, CBE (1909–1986), Ballet dancer, actor, director and choreographer
Graham Jenkin, poet, composer and historian
Hayley Lever (1876–1958), painter
Adam Liaw (1978–), lawyer and winner of 2010 MasterChef Australia
 Rex Heading (1929–2010), the creator of Humphrey B. Bear whose show won two Logies; former managing director of Channel Nine

Exploration
Duncan Chessell (1970–), Mountaineer
Cecil Madigan (1889–1947), explorer, Geologist, Rhodes Scholar, University Lecturer
 Andrew Martin (1951–), Marathon swimmer, first recorded solo crossing of the treacherous Backstairs Passage between Cape Jervis and Kangaroo Island.

Sport

Cricket
Greg Blewett (born 1971)
Greg Chappell, MBE (born 1948), Australian captain 1975–1977, 1979–1983
Ian Chappell (born 1943), Australian captain 1971–1975
Trevor Chappell (born 1952)
Joe Darling, CBE (1870–1946), Australian captain 1899–1902, 1902–1903, 1905
Rick Darling (born 1957)
Simon Douglas Fry (umpire 2001–)
Clem Hill (1877–1945), Australian captain 1910–1912
Tim May (born 1962)
Howard Rayner (1896–1975)
Paul Rofe (born 1981)
James Smith (born 1988)
Ashley Woodcock (born 1947)

Australian rules football
Edward Charles Atkins (1873-1966) Norwood (SA Premiers 1894), Sturt, West Perth (WA Premiers 1897), East Fremantle (WA)
Riley Bonner (1997–), Port Adelaide Football Club 
 Peter Dalwood, Norwood, Fitzroy, South Australia
Peter Darley (1944–) South Adelaide (206 games); premiership winners 1964, captain 1967–1969, 1971. 7 times best and fairest, leading goalkicker 1974
Rick Davies (1952–) South Australia (20 games, Captain 1980); SANFL: Sturt (317), South Adelaide (33); VFL: Hawthorn (20) 
Sam Day (1992–), Gold Coast Suns
Aaron Francis (1997–), Essendon Football Club
George Hewett (1995–), Sydney Swans Football Club
Wayne Jackson (1944–), CEO of the AFL (1996–2003)
Craig Kelly (1966–), Collingwood 
Ed Lower (1987–), North Melbourne Kangaroos
Nick Lower (1987–), Fremantle Dockers
Ian McKay (1923–2010), North Adelaide (164 Games, 45 Goals, Captain 1948–1955); South Australia (14 Games, Captain 1950–1951); 1950 Magarey Medalist.
Rodney Maynard (1966–), Adelaide Crows 
John Mossop (1959), Geelong (1979–1986), North Melbourne (1987–1988)
Kym Russell (1968–), Collingwood, Magpies 
David Pittman (1969–), Adelaide Crows 
Scott Russell (1970–), Collingwood, Magpies, Sydney Swans 
Luke Tapscott (1991–), Melbourne Demons
Jack Trengove (1991–), Melbourne Demons, Captain of Melbourne FC (2012–), youngest Captain in VFL/AFL history
Bernie Vince (1985–), Adelaide Crows, Melbourne Demons (2014–)
Jack Viney (1994–), Melbourne Demons
Tim Weatherald (1977–) Sturt and Norwood Football Club (SANFL), Magarey Medallist 2002
Zac Bailey (1999–) Brisbane Football Club
Tom Sparrow (2000–) Melbourne Football Club
Mitch Crowden (1999–) Fremantle Football Club
Kysaiah Pickett (2001-)- Melbourne Football Club
Harry Schoenberg (2001-)-Adelaide Football Club

Association football
John Hall (1994–), Western Sydney Wanderers and Olyroos

Rowing
Dr. Matthew Bolt (1986–), former Australian Under 23 Rower, stroke of the 2011 Bronze medal winning South Australian Kings Cup crew, member of 2012 Bronze medal winning Kings Cup crew, former Captain of Adelaide University Boat Club
Alexander Hill (1993–), Current Australian Rowing Team member, Olympic Silver Medallist (Rio 2016) M4-, World Cup Medallist, Australian Under 23 Rower, 2011/2012 Bronze medal winning Kings Cup crew member, former Under 19 World Champion
Brian Richardson (1948–), former Olympic Rower, Montreal 1976 and Moscow 1980

See also
List of schools in South Australia
List of boarding schools

References

External links
 
 

Uniting Church schools in Australia
International Baccalaureate schools in Australia
Educational institutions established in 1869
Boarding schools in South Australia
High schools in South Australia
Boys' schools in South Australia
Junior School Heads Association of Australia Member Schools
Private primary schools in Adelaide
1869 establishments in Australia

History of Adelaide